Capillaroglyphus is a genus of mites in the family Acaridae.

Species
 Capillaroglyphus polypori Klimov, 1998

References

Acaridae